f Eridani is a binary, or possibly a triple, star system in the equatorial constellation of Eridanus, consisting of stars HD 24071 and HD 24072. They share a single Hipparcos catalogue entry, HIP 17797, but have separate Bright Star Catalogue listings, HR 1189 and 1190.  f Eridani is the Bayer designation of the pair.

f Eridani is visible to the naked eye as a single star with a magnitude of 4.25. HD 24071 has an apparent visual magnitude of 5.25 and HD 24072 a magnitude of 4.72. As of 2009, the pair had an angular separation of  along a position angle of 216°. Both stars have an annual parallax shift , which provides a distance estimate to the system of 173 light years. The pair are members of the Tucana-Horologium moving group, a 45 million year old set of stars that share a common motion through space.

The brighter component, HD 24072, is a B-type main-sequence star with a classification of B9.5 Van. The n suffix indicates "nebulous" absorption lines which are caused by its rapid rotation. It has a projected rotational velocity of 225 km/s.

HD 24071 may itself be a spectroscopic binary.  The visible component is an A-type main-sequence star with a stellar classification of A1 Va. It is a suspected variable star of unknown type showing an amplitude of 0.05 magnitude, and is a source of X-ray emission, which may originate from a companion of class G2-5V.

References

Eridanus (constellation)
Eridani, f
Durchmusterung objects
024071/2
017797
1189/90
Suspected variables
Binary stars